Alan John Phillips (born 21 August 1954) is a former  international rugby union player and manager. A hooker, he played his club rugby for Cardiff RFC his modern game of forward play being so impressive that Cardiff selectors played him straight out of youth rugby (Kenfig Hill RFC). Phillips scored 162 tries in 481 appearances for Cardiff RFC. He was club captain at Cardiff 1985-87.

He toured South Africa with the British & Irish Lions in 1980 and was in the Wales squad for the 1987 Rugby World Cup. He won 18 caps for Wales between 1979 – 1987.

Phillips was Wales Team Manager from the Autumn of 2002 to 2019. Wales won three Grand Slams with Phillips as Team Manager (2005, 2008 & 2012).

References

1954 births
Living people
British & Irish Lions rugby union players from Wales
Cardiff RFC players
Rugby union hookers
Rugby union players from Bridgend
Wales international rugby union players
Welsh rugby union coaches
Welsh rugby union players